Aydyn Nikolayevich Saryglar (February 22, 1988, Saryg-Sep, Kaa-Khemsky District) is a Russian political figure and deputy of the 8th State Duma. 

After graduating from the university, Saryglar worked as a traumatologist-orthopedist at the Republican Hospital No. 1 (Tuva Republic). On September 9, 2018, he was elected deputy of the Kyzyl City Duma. Since September 2021, he has served as deputy of the 8th State Duma.

References

1988 births
Living people
United Russia politicians
21st-century Russian politicians
Eighth convocation members of the State Duma (Russian Federation)